Nicolás Martín Domínguez (born 28 June 1998) is an Argentine professional footballer who plays as a centre midfielder for Serie A club Bologna and the Argentina national team.

Club career
Domínguez played his first professional game for Vélez Sarsfield in a 3–2 victory against Estudiantes de La Plata for the 15th fixture of the 2016–17 Argentine Primera División, under Omar De Felippe's coaching. He scored his first goal in a 3–0 victory against Tigre for the 28th fixture of that season.

On 30 August 2019, he signed a contract with Italian club Bologna and was loaned back to Vélez Sarsfield for the rest of 2019. Domínguez made his debut for Bologna as a sub on 12 January in a 1–0 loss away at Torino. He would make his first start for the club on 19 January in a 1–1 home draw against Hellas Verona.

International career
He made his debut for Argentina national football team on 5 September 2019 in a friendly against Chile, as a 67th-minute substitute for Rodrigo De Paul.

Career statistics

Club

International

International goals
Scores and results list Argentina's goal tally first.

Honours
Argentina
Copa América: 2021
Superclásico de las Américas: 2019

References

External links
Profile at Vélez Sarsfield's official website 

1998 births
Sportspeople from Buenos Aires Province
Living people
Argentine footballers
Association football midfielders
Argentina international footballers
Club Atlético Vélez Sarsfield footballers
Bologna F.C. 1909 players
Argentine Primera División players
Argentine expatriate footballers
Expatriate footballers in Italy
2021 Copa América players
Copa América-winning players